The 2017 season for the  cycling team began in January at the Tour Down Under. As a UCI WorldTeam, they were automatically invited and obligated to send a squad to every event in the UCI World Tour.

Team roster 

Riders who joined the team for the 2017 season

Riders who left the team during or after the 2016 season

Season victories

National, Continental and World champions 2017

Footnotes

References

External links 
 

2017 road cycling season by team
Team Qhubeka NextHash
2017 in South African sport